This is a list of diplomatic missions of New Zealand. New Zealand's Ministry of Foreign Affairs and Trade (NZMFAT) is responsible for nearly fifty embassies and consulates globally. The country is particularly active in the South Pacific, as well as in Asia and South America where New Zealand is expanding its commercial reach. There is also an extensive number of honorary consulates who represent New Zealand. New Zealand's diplomatic missions in the capitals of other Commonwealth countries are called High Commissions (as opposed to embassies).

History
New Zealand independence was a gradual process, and the establishment of an independent New Zealand diplomatic service was similarly gradual. At first, New Zealand's foreign affairs were handled by the United Kingdom, and the only diplomacy conducted by the colonial government in New Zealand were negotiations with the British authorities. Relations between New Zealand and Britain were handled by an Agent-General in London, with the first being appointed in 1871. The title was changed to High Commissioner in 1905, reflecting the increasing autonomy of New Zealand.

It was not until World War II, however, that New Zealand sent permanent diplomatic missions to other countries. To facilitate co-ordination of the war effort New Zealand established several posts in countries with which it was allied—the first was a legation in the United States in 1941. In 1942 and 1943, high commissions were opened in Ottawa and Canberra respectively, and in 1944, a legation was established in the Soviet Union. The latter was considered a striking departure from New Zealand's previous diplomatic activities—enthusiasm for the post was strongest in the governing Labour Party, and the opposition National Party later made its closure one of their campaign policies.

The opening of these posts prompted New Zealand to establish its own foreign ministry, the Department of External Affairs. Created by the External Affairs Act in June 1943, the new Department incorporated an older office of the same name (dealing with island territories) and those sections of the Prime Minister's office which had previously co-ordinated diplomacy.

In 1947, a resident trade representative was appointed in Japan, followed by the establishment of legations in Paris (1949) and The Hague (1950). By the late 1950s, these three posts, along with Washington, had been upgraded to embassies —. However, fulfilling its promise the Moscow post was closed in 1950 by the new National Party government. From 1955 to 1961, a string of new missions opened in Asia—Singapore, India, Thailand, Malaysia, Hong Kong, and Indonesia. When Samoa obtained its independence from New Zealand in 1962, it became the first Pacific Island state to host a New Zealand diplomatic post.

The mid-1960s saw a cluster of new posts opening in Europe, with new missions in Belgium, Greece, Germany and Italy. A post was also opened in South Vietnam due to the ongoing conflict there, although this did not last beyond the end of the Vietnam War. A post was established in the Cook Islands after they obtained self-government from New Zealand, becoming New Zealand's second mission in the south Pacific.

The 1970s and 1980s were a time of continued expansion for NZMFAT. In 1973, the Labour government of Norman Kirk reopened its embassy in the Soviet Union and opened an embassy in the People's Republic of China. However it was in the Pacific where New Zealand's representation rapidly expanded as several countries gained independence, including Fiji, Papua New Guinea, the Solomon Islands, Kiribati, Niue, Tonga, and Vanuatu. Frequently New Zealand was the first country to establish a mission in these states.  New Zealand also expanded into the Middle East, Latin America, Africa, and elsewhere in Asia.

The early 1990s were a time of substantial reorganisation of New Zealand's diplomatic missions, and saw a number of closures. A substantial redistribution of New Zealand's European resources took place—posts in Greece and Austria were closed, while a new post was established in Spain. New Zealand's post in Iraq was closed due to the Gulf War, and the post in Bahrain was shut shortly afterwards—the post in Saudi Arabia assumed most of its duties, aided by a new post in Turkey. The end of apartheid in resulted in a decision to move New Zealand's post in Zimbabwe to South Africa. In South America New Zealand's embassy in Peru was also closed, but missions were opened in Brazil and Argentina.

In April 2008 it was announced that the budget for NZMFAT would be dramatically increased, and would include the opening of new missions in Stockholm and Brisbane.

On 4 May 2010 the Foreign Affairs Minister Murray McCully announced that New Zealand's diplomatic relations with Afghanistan will be formally represented by the first resident ambassador to Kabul, retired Army Brigadier Neville Reilly.  In addition the first Civil Director of the Provincial Reconstruction Team (PRT) in the central Afghan Province of Bamyan based in the Provincial Capital of Bamyan will be led by retired Air Commodore Dick Newlands of the Air Force. The Civil Director will replace the military aspects of the PRT with greater emphasis on civilian provided resources and services for the people of Bamyan.

Current missions

Africa

Americas

Asia

Europe

Oceania

Multilateral organisations

Gallery

Closed missions

Africa

Americas

Asia

Europe

Oceania

See also
 Foreign relations of New Zealand
 List of diplomatic missions in New Zealand
 Visa policy of New Zealand
 Visa requirements for New Zealand citizens

Notes

References

External links
Ministry of Foreign Affairs and Trade of New Zealand

 
Diplomatic missions
New Zealand